Eric Robert Walters,  (born March 3, 1957) is a Canadian author of young adult fiction and picture books. As of 2020, Eric Walters has written over 100 books.

Background
Walters was an elementary school teacher at Vista Heights Public School in Streetsville, Ontario. In 1993, he was teaching a grade 5 class in which many of the students were reluctant readers and writers. To encourage them, Walters wrote his first novel, Stand Your Ground. The novel was set in the school and included features from the community and the names of many of his students. He has since written more than 70 novels for young adults.
 
He is a three-time winner of both the Ontario Library Association Silver Birch and Red Maple Awards – voted on by over 100,000 students throughout the province of Ontario. His books have been translated and published in many countries.

Personal life
Eric Walters was born and raised in Toronto and resides in Guelph, Ontario, with his wife Anita. They have three adult children, Christina, Nick and Julia.

Walters tries to experience the subjects he plans to write about. In April 2010 he walked across the Sahara Desert before writing Just Deserts. With his son, he climbed Mount Kilimanjaro for Between Heaven and Earth. He played with tigers before writing Tiger by the Tail.

In addition, Walters founded the Creation of Hope, an organization providing care for orphans in the Mbooni district of Kenya. Presently more than 400 orphans are being provided with services that include food, school fees, uniforms, tools, beds, livestock, and the construction of two children's residences in the town of Kikima.

Awards
Walters's works have won or been nominated for the following awards:

Published works

Fiction
  Stand Your Ground (Fitzhenry & Whiteside 1994)
 Stars (Fitzhenry & Whiteside 1996)
 Trapped in Ice (Penguin 1997)
 War of the Eagles (Orca 1998)
 Diamonds in the Rough (Fitzhenry & Whiteside 1998)
 The Hydrofoil Mystery (Penguin 1999)
 Caged Eagles (Orca 2000)
 Rebound (Stoddart 2000)
 The Bully Boys (Penguin 2000)
 Northern Exposures (HarperCollins 2001)
 Camp X (Penguin 2002)
 Ricky (HarperCollins 2002)
 Tiger Town (Dundurn 2003)
 Run (Penguin 2003)
 Overdrive (Orca 2004)
 Grind (Orca 2004)
 Death by Exposure (Dundurn 2004)
 Underdog (Orca 2004)
 I've Got An Idea (HarperCollins 2004)
 The True Story of Santa Claus (2005)
 Juice (Orca 2005)
 Elixir (Penguin 2005)
 Triple Threat (Orca 2005)
 Stuffed (Orca 2006)
 Laggan Lard Butts (Orca 2006)
 We All Fall Down (Doubleday 2006)
 Shattered (Penguin 2006)
 House Party (Orca 2007)
 Bifocal (Fitzhenry & Whiteside 2007)
 Safe as Houses (Doubleday 2007) 
 Tiger Trap (Dundurn 2007)
 Sketches (Penguin 2007)
 Boot Camp (Orca 2007)
 The Falls (Penguin 2008)
 In A Flash (Orca 2008)
 When Elephants Fight (Orca, 2008)
 Voyageur (Penguin, 2008)
 The Pole (Penguin 2008)
 Splat! (Orca 2008)
 Alexandria of Africa (Doubleday 2008)
 Special Edward (Orca, 2009)
 Black & White (Penguin, 2009)
 Tell Me Why (Doubleday, 2009)
 Wounded (Penguin, 2009)
 United We Stand (Doubleday, 2009)
 Shell Shocked (Penguin, 2009)
 Wave (Doubleday, 2009)
 Beverly Hills Maasai (Doubleday, 2010)
 Branded (Orca, 2010)
 Trouble in Paradise (Penguin, 2010)
 Home Team (Orca, 2010)
 Fly Boy (Penguin, 2010)
 Shaken (Doubleday, January 2011)
 Catboy (Orca, September 2011)
 Just Deserts (Penguin, September 2011)
 Between Heaven and Earth (2012)
 The Matato Ride (Spring 2012)
 The Taming (Spring 2012) with Teresa Toten
 End of Days (Doubleday, September 2012)
 Power Play (Spring 2013)
 Tagged (Fall 2013)
 My Name is Blessing (Fall 2013)
 The Rule of Three (Farrar, Straus and Giroux, January 2014)
 Walking Home (Doubleday, 2014)
 Saving Sammy (Orca 2014)
 The Power of Three (Razorbill 2014)
 Sleeper (Orca 2014)
 Hope Springs (Tundra, September 2014)
 Regenesis (Doubleday Canada 2015)
 The Fight of Power (Razorbill 2015)
 The Will to Survive (Razorbill 2016)
 90 Days of Different (Orca 2017)
 Always With You (Nimbus Publishing, 2019)
 The Boy Who Moved Christmas (Nimbus Publishing, 2020)
 Don't Stand So Close to Me (Orca 2020)
 The King of Jam Sandwiches (Orca 2020)

Non-fiction
 Improve Your Child's Spelling 1 (1991) (with Norm Rippon)
 Improve Your Child's Spelling 2 (1993) (with Norm Rippon)
 When Elephants Fight (2008) (with Adrian Bradbury)
 Tell Me Why (2009)
 From the Heart of Africa: a Book of Wisdom (2018)

References

External links

  
 
 CM profile of Walters – incorporating material from a 1998 interview 
 Creation of Hope project in Kikima, Kenya
 

1957 births
 Canadian writers of young adult literature
 Canadian science fiction writers
 Writers from Toronto
 Living people
 Canadian male novelists
Governor General's Award-winning children's writers
21st-century Canadian male writers